Awana is one of the largest ruling clans (lineage) of the Gurjars.

References

Gurjar clans